Gundog is a British Oi! and street punk band from London.

In 1998, their debut album, They Who Laugh Last..., was released on LP by British New Blood Records and on compact disc on Swedish label Sidekicks Records.

References

External links

British punk rock groups